The Lebăda Vest oil field is an oil field located on the continental shelf of the Black Sea. It was discovered in 1980 and developed by Petrom. It began production in 1993 and produces oil. The field also produces around 35.8 million cubic feet/day (1×105m³) of gas and has reserves of 200 billion cubic feet (5.7×109m³).

References

Black Sea energy
Oil fields in Romania